Oh Min-taek (born February 11, 1991), better known by his stage name Elo, is a South Korean singer. He released his debut album, 8 Femmes, on August 26, 2016.

Discography

Studio albums

Extended plays

Singles

As lead artist

Collaborations

As featured artist

References

External links

1991 births
Living people
South Korean hip hop singers
21st-century South Korean  male singers